Juliusz Stanisław Kruszankin (born 5 June 1965) is a Polish footballer. He played in seven matches for the Poland national football team from 1986 to 1993.

References

External links
 

1965 births
Living people
Polish footballers
Poland international footballers
Association football defenders
Footballers from Łódź
Hetman Zamość players
Stal Stalowa Wola players
GKS Bełchatów players
Lechia Gdańsk players
Legia Warsaw players
Hapoel Haifa F.C. players
ŁKS Łódź players